Satilla is a census-designated place and unincorporated community in Jeff Davis County, Georgia, United States. Its population was 487 as of the 2020 census. U.S. Route 23 passes through the community.

Demographics

References

Populated places in Jeff Davis County, Georgia
Census-designated places in Georgia (U.S. state)
Unincorporated communities in Georgia (U.S. state)